William Edwards (born 8 January 1952) is an English former professional footballer who played in the Football League as a central defender, most notably for Wimbledon.

Personal life 
After leaving professional football, Edwards served as a policeman for 18 years.

Honours 
Walton & Hersham

 FA Amateur Cup: 1972–73
Wimbledon

 Southern League Premier Division: 1974–75, 1975–76, 1976–77

Individual
 Wimbledon Player of the Year: 1976–77

References

1952 births
Living people
Footballers from Paddington
English footballers
Association football defenders
Walton & Hersham F.C. players
Wimbledon F.C. players
Maidstone United F.C. (1897) players
English Football League players
National League (English football) players
Tooting & Mitcham United F.C. players
Leatherhead F.C. players
Dulwich Hamlet F.C. players
British police officers